The Samuelson Baronetcy, of Bodicote in Banbury in the County of Oxford, is a title in the Baronetage of the United Kingdom. It was created on 29 July 1884 for Bernhard Samuelson. He was a businessman, liberal member of parliament for Banbury and a pioneer of technical education. The baronetcy was conferred on him for his services to education. The second Baronet represented Cheltenham and Frome in the House of Commons as a Liberal.

Samuelson baronets, of Bodicote (1884)
Sir Bernhard Samuelson, 1st Baronet (1820–1905)
Sir Henry Bernhard Samuelson, 2nd Baronet (1845–1937)
Sir Francis Arthur Edward Samuelson, 3rd Baronet (1861–1946)
Sir Francis Henry Bernard Samuelson, 4th Baronet (1890–1981)
Sir (Bernard) Michael Francis Samuelson, 5th Baronet (1917–2008)
Sir James Francis Samuelson, 6th Baronet (born 1956)
The Heir Presumptive is Edward Bernard Samuelson (born 1967), younger brother of the present Baronet.

Notes

References
Kidd, Charles, Williamson, David (editors). Debrett's Peerage and Baronetage (1990 edition). New York: St Martin's Press, 1990, 

Samuelson
People from Bodicote